An antler is the large horn-like appendage of deer or related species.

Antler or Antlers may also refer to:

People

Antler (poet) (born 1946), American poet who lives in Wisconsin

Places
In Canada
Rural Municipality of Antler No. 61, Saskatchewan
Antler, Saskatchewan

In the United States
Antlers, Colorado
Antler, Missouri
Antler, North Dakota
Antlers, Oklahoma
Antler, West Virginia

Other
Antler Luggage, a brand of suitcase
Antlers (band), a black metal band based in Germany
Antlers (Pillow Pal), a Pillow Pal moose made by Ty, Inc.
The Antlers (University of Missouri), a student cheering section at University of Missouri basketball games
The Antlers (band), an indie rock band based in Brooklyn
Antlers Hotel (Colorado Springs, Colorado), also known as The Antlers
Kashima Antlers, a J. League football team
Antler Peak, a prominent mountain peak in Yellowstone National Park
Deer horn knives, a martial arts weapon sometimes called deer antlers
Antlers (2007 film), ( Panache), a 2007 Canadian documentary film
Antlers (2021 film), a 2021 supernatural horror film

See also
ANTLR
Antlers Hotel (disambiguation)